Ewald Follmann (28 January 1926 – 20 June 1990) was a German footballer who played for FC Nancy, Borussia Neunkirchen and the Saarland national team as a forward.

References

1926 births
1990 deaths
German footballers
Saar footballers
Saarland international footballers
FC Nancy players
Borussia Neunkirchen players
Association football forwards
German expatriate footballers
German expatriate sportspeople in France
Expatriate footballers in France